Spire is a 453 ft (138m) tall skyscraper in Atlanta, Georgia. It was built from 2004 to 2005 on the site of the former Atlanta Cabana Motel. It has 28 floors and is tied with the Equitable Building as the 21st tallest building in the city, and has 392 units.

See also
List of tallest buildings in Atlanta

References
Skyscraperpage

Residential skyscrapers in Atlanta
Midtown Atlanta
Residential condominiums in the United States
Residential buildings completed in 2005